Romance of the Rockies is a 1937 American Western film directed by Robert North Bradbury and written by Robert Emmett Tansey. The film stars Tom Keene, Beryl Wallace, Franklyn Farnum, Don Orlando, Bill Cody Jr. and Earl Dwire. The film was released on December 15, 1937, by Monogram Pictures.

Plot

Cast           
Tom Keene as Dr. Tom Foster
Beryl Wallace as Betty Ross
Franklyn Farnum as Stone
Don Orlando as Mike
Bill Cody Jr. as Jimmy Allen
Earl Dwire as Trigger
Russell Paul as Saloon Singer
Steve Clark as Deputy
Charles Murphy as Sheriff
Jim Corey as Henchman
Tex Palmer as Henchman
Blackie Whiteford as Henchman
Frank Ellis as Henchman

References

External links
 

1937 films
1930s English-language films
American Western (genre) films
1937 Western (genre) films
Monogram Pictures films
Films directed by Robert N. Bradbury
American black-and-white films
1930s American films